National Award for Plastic Arts or National Prize for Plastic Arts may refer to:

 , Catalonia, formerly Premi Nacional d'Arts Plàstiques
 National Prize for Plastic Arts (Chile)
 
 National Award for Plastic Arts (Spain)
 National Prize of Plastic Arts of Venezuela